Benjamín Andrés Inostroza Zuñiga (born 25 April 1997) is a Chilean footballer who currently plays for Deportes Limache.

Career
He debuted on 12 September 2012 in a match against Santiago Morning for the 2012 Copa Chile, scoring the second goal of Universidad de Chile in the match, and becoming the youngest Chilean player to score in an official match. He played his first league match on 29 September in a match against Unión La Calera

However, Inostroza's career didn't go as expected. He failed to find a regular place in U. de Chile's senior side and went on loan to lower-division Deportes Pintana. Later he joined Audax Italiano's youth side, but never made it into the club's senior side. Inostroza spent the rest of his career in the lower divisions of Chilean football.

Career statistics

Club

References

External links

1997 births
Living people
People from Santiago
Chilean footballers
Chilean Primera División players
Segunda División Profesional de Chile players
Universidad de Chile footballers
Audax Italiano footballers
Deportes Colchagua footballers
Deportes Iberia footballers
Deportes Limache footballers
Association football forwards
Footballers from Santiago